Aytos Municipality (Bulgarian: Община Айтос, Obshtina Aytos) is a municipality in Burgas Province, Bulgaria. It includes the town of Aytos and 16 villages.

Religion 
According to the latest Bulgarian census of 2011, the religious composition, among those who answered the optional question on religious identification, was the following:

Gallery

References

External links

 

Municipalities in Burgas Province